The 2021–22 Montana Grizzlies basketball team represented the University of Montana in the 2021–22 NCAA Division I men's basketball season. The Grizzlies, led by eighth-year head coach Travis DeCuire, played their home games at Dahlberg Arena in Missoula, Montana as members of the Big Sky Conference.

Previous season
In a season limited due to the ongoing COVID-19 pandemic, the Grizzlies finished the 2020–21 season 15–13, 7–9 in Big Sky play to finish in sixth place. They defeated Idaho and Weber State in the Big Sky tournament before losing to Eastern Washington in the semifinals.

Offseason

Departures

Incoming transfers

Recruiting classes

2021 recruiting class

2022 recruiting class

Roster

Schedule and results 

|-
!colspan=12 style=| Regular season

|-
!colspan=12 style=| Big Sky tournament

|-

Source

References

Montana Grizzlies basketball seasons
Montana Grizzlies
Montana Grizzlies basketball
Montana Grizzlies basketball